Giupponi Franca is a Brazilian race car driver who competed in the Formula Super Vee and attempted to qualify for two Indycar races in 1988.  In the 1985 Super Vee season, Giupponi finished 31st in points. Nobody knows in what date he was born.

Motorsports Career Results

American Open-Wheel
(key)

CART

References

External links 
 

Living people
Year of birth missing (living people)
Brazilian racing drivers